Indian Airlines Flight 113 was a flight operating from Mumbai to Ahmedabad that crashed on its final approach to Ahmedabad Airport on 19 October 1988, killing 133 of the 135 people on board.

Aircraft and crew
The aircraft was a Boeing 737-200, registered VT-EAH, delivered new to Indian Airlines in December 1970, and had accumulated 42,831 hours and 47,647 landings.

The flight crew consisted of captain O.M. Dallaya and first officer Deepak Nagpal.

Accident
The flight was scheduled to depart at 0545 IST but was delayed 20 minutes due to one no-show passenger. The aircraft departed Bombay at 0605, and at 0620 the crew contacted Ahmedabad Approach Control. Clearance to descend to FL 150 (approximately ) was given at 0632 IST and the crew was advised to report when the aircraft was at  overhead the Ahmedabad VHF omnidirectional range (VOR). The QNH was correctly read back by the crew.

The pilot decided to carry out a localiser-DME approach for runway 23 and reported overhead of Ahmedabad at 0647 IST. The aircraft went outbound and reported turning inbound at 0650 IST. This was the last transmission from the aircraft to ATC.

The flight crew did not seek any permission or clearance for landing, nor did they give standard call-outs after . The cockpit voice recorder conversation between the pilot and the co-pilot showed that both were focused on trying to see the runway and they had decided to attempt such a landing and in their anxiety to see the field, they lost track of their altitude. Instead of the pilot-in-command concentrating on the instruments, both pilots were trying to sight the runway without paying necessary attention to the altimeter.

AT 0653 IST the aircraft struck trees and a high-tension electricity transmission pylon and went down on the outskirts of Chiloda Kotarpur village, near the Noble Nagar Housing Society near Ahmedabad.

Several NOTAMs had been issued for Ahmedabad airport, specifically for the absence of approach lights; and for the glide path being absent from the Instrument Landing System, leaving only the localiser available. The Airport Authority said it was a mandatory requirement that the pilot be able to see the runway from 500 feet and that if the pilot had not seen the runway, he should have never descended below 500 feet, and if the runway was visible, he should have been able to land. The fact that the aircraft crashed  from the airport showed that he had not sighted the runway.

The Airport Authority also stated that the VOR had to have been operational at the time, because the pilot was able to make inbound and outbound turns using the VOR as a reference. The localiser also had to have been operational and used by the pilots, because the aircraft had crashed on the extended centerline of the runway. Data collected from the aircraft's flight recorders shows the pilots did not make sure of the airport's DME and VASI lights, and since their altimeters were working correctly, ignored or did not maintain awareness of the aircraft's altitude.

It was also determined that the airport personnel did not make Runway Visual Range measurements in the declining visibility situation, as was their duty and fully within their capability, and therefore did not render RVR reports to the pilots.

Victims
The flight carried 129 passengers (124 adults and 5 children) and 6 crew (pilot, co-pilot, and 4 cabin crew). All 6 crew members were killed in the crash. Professor Labdhi Bhandari from Indian Institute of Management, Ahmedabad was one of the prominent victims of the crash.

Five passengers initially survived the crash and were transported to hospital, but three succumbed to their injuries.

Investigation
The Court of Inquiry arrived at the following conclusion;
 The cause of the accident is error of judgment on the part of the Pilot-in-command as well as the Co-pilot associated with poor visibility which was not passed to aircraft.

After receiving the report, the Government of India appointed a committee to evaluate the report with the United States National Transportation Safety Board. The Government of India then accepted the report and made the following modification;
 The cause of the accident is error of judgment on the part of the Pilot-in-command as well as the Co-pilot due to non-adherence to laid down procedures, under poor visibility conditions.

Compensation
In 1989, Indian Airlines had initially offered to pay ₹ 200,000 as full and final settlement to the relatives of each of the victims, the maximum amount allowed under Rules 17 and 22 of the Second Schedule to the Carriage by Air Act 1972. To receive a higher payout, the plaintiffs would have to prove under Rule 25 of said schedule that the damage resulted from an act or omission of the airline done recklessly and with knowledge that damage would probably result, so as to render the limit of liability (₹ 200,000) inapplicable.

This was successfully challenged in the Ahmedabad City Civil court on 14 October 2009 and higher amounts were awarded by the court on a case-by-case basis, including factors such as age of the deceased, income, occupation, future prospects and life expectancy. A bench comprising Justices M S Shah and H N Devani passed the order and directed Indian Airlines and the Airport Authority of India (AAI) to pay the compensation to the petitioners by 31 December 2009. Indian Airlines would pay 70 percent of the compensation and AAI the remaining 30 percent. The compensation amount would be paid along with an interest of nine percent per annum calculated from 1989 when the petitioners had approached the lower court.

The final High Court ruling was thus;

See also
 List of accidents and incidents involving commercial aircraft

References

Aviation accidents and incidents in 1988
Aviation accidents and incidents in India
Airliner accidents and incidents involving controlled flight into terrain
113
Accidents and incidents involving the Boeing 737 Original
1988 in India
October 1988 events in Asia
History of Ahmedabad
Events in Ahmedabad